(Thomas) Richard John Long Chaloner, 3rd Baron Gisborough (born 1 July 1927), is a British peer.

Chaloner was born at Hurworth Old Hall, Darlington, the son of Thomas Chaloner, 2nd Baron Gisborough, and Esther Hall. He succeeded his father as Baron Gisborough in 1951. In 1967 he was appointed to the Board of Universal Television Yorkshire. In 1973, he was appointed deputy lieutenant of the North Riding of Yorkshire and in 1981 he became Lord Lieutenant of Cleveland. Lord Gisborough was the only member of the House of Lords to be in place for both the accession of Queen Elizabeth II and her successor King Charles III.

Further reading 
Inheriting the Earth: The Long Family's 500 Year Reign in Wiltshire; Cheryl Nicol

References

1927 births
Living people
Barons in the Peerage of the United Kingdom
Richard Chaloner, 3rd Baron Gisborough
Lord-Lieutenants of North Yorkshire
People from Guisborough
Gisborough